Zazem-e Olya (also Romanized as Zāzem-e ʿlīā) is a village in Howmeh Rural District, in the Central District of Harsin County, Kermanshah Province, Iran. At the 2006 census, its population was 29, in 7 families.

References 

Populated places in Harsin County